Lancaster Township is located in Stephenson County, Illinois. As of the 2010 census, its population was 1,587 and it contained 692 housing units.

Geography
Lancaster is Township 27 North, Range 8 East of the Fourth Principal Meridian.

Demographics

References

External links
City-data.com
Stephenson County Official Site

Townships in Stephenson County, Illinois
Townships in Illinois